Hayesiana farintaenia is a moth of the family Sphingidae. It is known from eastern China. This species was known for many years by an unpublished manuscript name "Schausanus barnesi", with two specimens in the Carnegie Museum of Natural History. This name has been superseded by the newly published name Hayesiana farintaenia.

The upperside of the body and wings is almost uniformly dark olive green. The thorax and abdomen upperside are brown and the basal tergites yellowish. The underside of the thorax and abdomen underside are ochre. The forewing upperside is uniform dark olive-green, with a narrow diffuse pale purple band running from the costa near the apex to the tornus, distal to which is a conspicuous pale yellow spot.

References

Macroglossini
Moths described in 1997